SplitsTree is a popular freeware program for inferring phylogenetic trees, phylogenetic networks, or, more generally, splits graphs, from various types of data such as a sequence alignment, a distance matrix or a set of trees. SplitsTree implements published methods such as split decomposition, neighbor-net, consensus networks, super networks methods or methods for computing hybridization or simple recombination networks. It uses the NEXUS file format. The splits graph is defined using a special data block (SPLITS block).

See also 
Phylogenetic tree viewers
Dendroscope
MEGAN

References

External links 
SplitsTree homepage (New Website for informations about SplitsTree)
Alternative download page for the latest version (4.15) and manual (June 2019), hosted by the Department of Computer Science at the Eberhard Karls University Tübingen
Algorithms in Bioinformatics, Daniel Huson's working group developing SplitsTree and other bioinformatics software
List of phylogeny software, hosted at the University of Washington
The Genealogical World of Phylogenetic Networks provides a wide range of examples for splits graphs, most of which were generated with SplitsTree
Who is Who in Phylogenetic Networks lists software, researchers and literature dealing with phylogenetic networks

Phylogenetics software
Molecular biology